The United States Employment Service (USES) is an agency of the federal government of the United States responsible for "assisting coordination of the State public employment services in providing labor exchange and job finding assistance to job seekers and employers".

History
In around 1890, both the United States and European governments created government-funded employment offices to provide work for unemployed unskilled laborers.  These services proved to be unsuccessful.  In 1933 during the Great Depression, with the Wagner-Peyser Act, the USES was reinstated “to set minimum standards, develop uniform administrative and statistical procedures, publish employment information, and promote a system of "clearing labor" between states.” Then President Franklin D. Roosevelt had created many government-funded work projects to help boost the economy and the USES was responsible for hiring the workers on those projects. The USES operated originally in only a few states but by World War II, it was operating in all states and played a major role in providing jobs during the war. In the United States home front during World War II, the service coordinated employment of prisoners of war (e.g., using German POWs at Gettysburg for local pulpwood cutting).

Like many labor organizations of its time, the USES officially stated a belief in racial equality in the workplace, yet it provided fewer jobs for its African American workers. Historian Eric Arnesen from the University of Illinois argues that, “although the agency stated its general opposition to racial discrimination, it referred very few African Americans to jobs in war industries, defense training courses, or youth work-defense projects. In fact, the central administration encouraged its branches, especially in the South, to oblige employer preferences by accommodating racial discrimination.” In the Bureau of Agricultural Economics instructional manual for the USES during wartime from the 1940s, it reads that the USES policy was, “to make all referrals without regard to race, color, creed, or national origin except when an employer’s order includes these specifications which the employer is not willing to eliminate,” and if the employer had no racial preferences “but community custom or past hiring practices of the employer indicate that he may refuse to hire individuals of a particular race, color, creed, or national origin, the employment office interviewer shall ascertain whether or not he has any restrictive specifications.”

See also
 Workforce Innovation and Opportunity Act (H.R. 803; 113th Congress)
 Employment and Training Administration

References

External links

 Employment and Training Administration
 State Unemployment Insurance and Employment Service Operations account on USAspending.gov
 Training and Employment Service account on USAspending.gov
 Job Corps account on USAspending.gov

Employment agencies of the United States
United States Department of Labor
Public employment service
1933 establishments in the United States